Isa Phillips (born 22 April 1984) is a Jamaican hurdling athlete who specialises in the 400 metres hurdles.

The Kingston native made his international debut at the 2001 World Youth Championships in Athletics, finishing sixth in the 400 m hurdles semi-finals. He won the national under-18s championship in the event in 2001. Phillips took to the senior circuit in 2003 and broke the 50-second-barrier in 2005, setting a personal best of 49.96 seconds in Arlington, Texas.

His first major competition was the 2007 World Championships in Athletics where he finished fourth in the heats. The following year he represented Jamaica at the 2008 Summer Olympics and reached the semi-finals of the 400 m hurdles. He closed the season with a bronze medal win at the 2008 World Athletics Final, finishing behind compatriot Danny McFarlane and American Kerron Clement.

He lowered his personal best to 48.36 seconds at the Grande Prêmio Brasil Caixa meet in May 2009, making him the sixth fastest Jamaican in the event. He again improved at the Jamaican national championships, qualifying for the 2009 World Championships with a world-leading time of 48.05 s; Winthrop Graham and Danny McFarlane were the only Jamaicans who had faster times.

Phillips ran track collegiately at Louisiana State University.

Personal bests

All information taken from IAAF profile.

Competition record

References

External links
 
 

1984 births
Living people
Jamaican male hurdlers
Athletes (track and field) at the 2008 Summer Olympics
Athletes (track and field) at the 2011 Pan American Games
Olympic athletes of Jamaica
LSU Tigers track and field athletes
Sportspeople from Kingston, Jamaica
World Athletics Championships athletes for Jamaica
Pan American Games medalists in athletics (track and field)
Pan American Games silver medalists for Jamaica
Medalists at the 2011 Pan American Games